is the fourteenth Lupin III television special. It premiered on Nippon TV in 2002, as part of the commemoration of the 30th anniversary of the Lupin III TV series. The special depicts the first meeting of Lupin and the rest of his gang.

Plot
Daisuke Jigen is asked by a reporter to tell the story of how he met Arsène Lupin III and the rest of the gang.  He tells about the time he was hired by a millionaire named Galvez to help guard the Clam of Helmeth, a green cylinder made of unbreakable metal. The cylinder contained instructions on how to forge a metal similar to the one that composed it. The Clam has also gained the attentions of both Lupin, a fellow thief named Brad, and Brad's partner, Fujiko Mine.

Brad manages to steal the Clam, but is murdered by Galves' henchman, Shade. Lupin and Fujiko now have possession of it, but no means to open it.  Meanwhile, Inspector Koichi Zenigata has been dispatched by the Japanese police to hunt down and arrest Fujiko. He is paired with George McFly, an American detective who is his only resource.  And on the other side of the world, Goemon Ishikawa XIII is seeking a sword worthy of his skills.

The key to opening the Clam of Helmeth is now the focus of everyone's efforts, but who will come across it first?  And, more importantly, how much of Jigen's story is the truth?

Voice cast

External links 
 
Lupin III Encyclopedia

Lupin the Third
2002 anime films
Anime television films
TMS Entertainment
Discotek Media
Films directed by Osamu Dezaki